Mildenau is a municipality in the district of Erzgebirgskreis, in Saxony, Germany.

History 
From 1952 to 1990, Mildenau was part of the Bezirk Karl-Marx-Stadt of East Germany.

Notable people 

 Josh Cahill (1986), Aviation Vlogger and Blogger

References 

Erzgebirgskreis